Captain John Niel Randle, VC (22 December 1917 – 6 May 1944) was a British Army officer and a recipient of the Victoria Cross (VC), the highest award for gallantry in the face of the enemy that can be awarded to British and Commonwealth forces. His was one of three Second World War VCs awarded for action in India, the other two being awarded to John Pennington Harman (also at the Battle of Kohima) and Abdul Hafiz at the Battle of Imphal.

Early life
John Niel Randle was born in India, the son of Edith Joan, daughter of William Chaffey Whitby, and Dr. Herbert Niel Randle, Librarian of the India Office Library, who was also Professor of Philosophy at Queen's College, Benares and a writer on Indian philosophy.

Randle was educated at the Dragon School, Marlborough College, and Merton College, Oxford. At Oxford he qualified in law. His best friend there, Leonard Cheshire, was awarded the VC in the Second World War. Randle married Mavis Ellen Manser of Holywell, Oxford, sister of Leslie Thomas Manser who was awarded the VC posthumously in 1942 after a bombing raid on Cologne.

Military career
Randle was commissioned a second lieutenant in the Royal Norfolk Regiment in May 1940. At the age of 26, he was promoted to temporary captain whilst serving with the 2nd Battalion, Royal Norfolk Regiment.

Captain Randle was commander of 'B' Company, 2nd Battalion, Royal Norfolk Regiment. On 4 May 1944 during the Battle of Kohima in northeast India, he was ordered to attack the Japanese flank on General Purpose Transport (GPT) Ridge during the relief and clearance of Kohima. The citation from the London Gazette reads:

The medal
His Victoria Cross is on loan to the Imperial War Museum by his son John. It is displayed alongside that of his friend Leonard Cheshire.

Legacy

Randle was portrayed by Tom Hiddleston in the 2006 television docudrama Victoria Cross Heroes, which included archive footage, dramatisations of his actions and an interview with his son and grandson.

A memorial to Captain Randle is in St Peter's Church, Petersham.

References

External links
 
 British Military History Biographies R

1917 births
1944 deaths
Military personnel of British India
People from Varanasi
People educated at The Dragon School
People educated at Marlborough College
Royal Norfolk Regiment officers
British Army personnel killed in World War II
British World War II recipients of the Victoria Cross
British Army recipients of the Victoria Cross
Alumni of Merton College, Oxford
Burials at Kohima War Cemetery
People from British India